Recep Çelik (born June 10, 1983 in Diyarbakır, Turkey) is a Turkish racewalker. He graduated 2004 in physical education and sports from the Vocational College of Aksaray at Niğde University before he studied Regional Public Administration at Anadolu University.

He is the holder of the national records in 10 km walk (road) and 20 km walk (road). Recep Çelik represented Turkey in the 20km race walk event at the 2008 Olympics in Beijing. He is qualified to take part in the same event at the 2012 Olympics in London.

Çelik won the 20km event of the 2011 Balkan Race Walking Championship held on April 9 in Bucharest, Romania, clocking 1:22.31 and setting a new Turkish record.

He qualified for participation in the 20 km walk event at the 2012 Summer Olympics.

Doping 
Çelik tested positive for the anabolic steroid Metenolone in May 2012, and was subsequently handed a two-year ban from sports.

Personal bests
According to IAAF database, his personal bests are:
10 km walk: 40:44 min (2011)
20,000 m walk: 1:23:49.9 hrs (2011)
20 km walk: 1:22:31 hrs (2011)

References

1983 births
Doping cases in athletics
Sportspeople from Diyarbakır
Turkish sportspeople in doping cases
Living people
Turkish male racewalkers
Athletes (track and field) at the 2008 Summer Olympics
Olympic athletes of Turkey
Anadolu University alumni
Niğde University alumni
Izmir Büyükşehir Belediyespor athletes
21st-century Turkish people